Eliot Allen Richards (born 10 September 1991) is a Welsh professional footballer who plays as a midfielder for Pontypridd United.

Club career

Bristol Rovers
A product of the Rovers youth system, Richards joined the professional ranks at the club in the summer of 2009.

He was the first of the group to break into the first team when he made his debut on 20 February 2010, when he came on as a 73rd-minute substitute for Andy Williams in a Football League One match against Gillingham.

He scored his first goal of the 2011–12 season against Leyton Orient at Portman Road on 13 August 2011, which Rovers lost 3–2. On 4 December 2011, he scored 2 goals in Rovers 6–1 FA Cup rout against Totton. On 14 April, Richards scored his first hat-trick against Burton Albion in a match Bristol Rovers won 7–1.

On 29 September 2012, Elliot Richards scored his first goal of the season in a away match at local rivals Exeter City, the goal proved to be the match winner for Bristol Rovers in a 2–1 Victory.

He received his first red card for Bristol Rovers in a 2–1 defeat away against at Rochdale.

On 6 May 2014, after Bristol Rovers were relegated to the Football Conference, he, along with 12 other players at Bristol Rovers were released from the club.

Exeter City (loan)
On 7 February 2014, Richards joined Exeter City on loan for the remainder of the 2013–14 season with Alan Gow joining Bristol Rovers on loan in the opposite direction.

Tranmere Rovers
On 28 May 2014, Richards became new Tranmere Rovers manager Rob Edwards first signing, signing a two-year deal with the club. Richards scored his first Tranmere goal on 23 August against Cheltenham Town. Richards left Tranmere on 2 February 2015 by mutual consent.

Cheltenham Town
Richards signed an 18-month deal with Cheltenham Town on 2 February 2015. He rejoined Rob Edwards, who after being sacked by Tranmere had recently been appointed as Cheltenham assistant manager.

On 28 March 2015, it was announced that Richards had been diagnosed with testicular cancer. On 4 September he has been given the all-clear in his battle with cancer and aimed to return to the pitch at Christmas.

In January 2016, Eliot joined National League South side Bath City on loan for a month.

Richards was released by Cheltenham Town in March 2016.

Tampa Bay Rowdies
On 4 April 2016, Richards signed with the Tampa Bay Rowdies of the North American Soccer League through the end of NASL spring season, with an option for the remainder of the 2016 season and the 2017 full season, linking up with former Bristol Rovers team-mate and Rowdies head coach Stuart Campbell. However, Richards did not play any games in the US before returning to the UK.

Non-league
Richards joined Weston-super-Mare in August 2016 after obtaining international clearance. Two months later he joined Southern Football League club Merthyr Town on loan until 31 December, before signing permanently in January. After ten goals in 52 appearances for the Martyrs, Richards joined league rivals Hereford in November 2017, winning promotion at the end of the season. Richards left the Bulls in August 2019 after deciding to join a new club permanently rather than play temporarily elsewhere to earn a new deal. He then re-joined Merthyr for the 2019-20 season. In July 2020, Richards agreed to remain with Merthyr for the 2020-21 season, however on 10 September 2020, Richards moved up two divisions to join National League side Barnet. In November, Richards sustained multiple injuries in Barnet's FA Cup win over Burton Albion, including tears of his anterior cruciate ligament and meniscus. He was released at the end of the season. After 13 months out injured Richards re-joined Merthyr in December 2021.

International career
Richards was called up to the Wales national under-19 football team in April 2010, for their squad to face Northern Ireland on 5 May.

Richards was called up to the Wales Under 21 squad for the first time in August 2012 for their match against Armenia.

Career statistics

References

External links

 (appearances between 2009 and summer 2011)
 (appearances from the start of the 2011–12 season onward)

1991 births
Living people
People from New Tredegar
Sportspeople from Caerphilly County Borough
Welsh footballers
Wales youth international footballers
Association football forwards
Bristol Rovers F.C. players
Exeter City F.C. players
Tranmere Rovers F.C. players
Cheltenham Town F.C. players
Bath City F.C. players
Tampa Bay Rowdies players
Weston-super-Mare A.F.C. players
Merthyr Town F.C. players
Hereford F.C. players
Barnet F.C. players
English Football League players
National League (English football) players
Southern Football League players
Cymru Premier players
Welsh expatriate sportspeople in the United States
Expatriate soccer players in the United States
Welsh expatriate footballers